Taeniotes peruanus is a species of beetle in the family Cerambycidae. It was described by Stephan von Breuning in 1971. It is known from Peru.

References

peruanus
Beetles described in 1971